The Sariwon class corvette(사리원급 초계함) is a Soviet-designed corvette used by North Korea.

The class is based on the Soviet Fugas-class Tral type fleet minesweepers, but were built in North Korea in the 1960s. It is believed five ships of this type are currently active in the Korean People's Navy.

Stationed on the east coast, these ships were likely built at either Mayang-do Naval Shipyards or Bong Dao Bo Shipyards in nearby Sinpo on the mainland.

See also

 Fugas-class minesweeper

References

 Jane's Warship Recognition Guide 2006

External links
 PG Sariwon Class at GlobalSecurity.org

Corvette classes
Corvettes of the Korean People's Navy